The Cleveland House is located in Versailles, Kentucky. Originally the Cleveland Orphan Home, it was an orphanage that incorporated in 1869, remaining in operation until the 1950s. The original 1875 house was made of brick in classic revival style architecture. The current structure was built in 1926, a 2½-story Dutch Colonial Revival building on the main foundation of the earlier house.

The current building is home of The Woodford Inn, a 10-room bed and breakfast inn. Prior to becoming The Woodford Inn, it was The Cleveland Home, a residential facility for girls through age 17, until its closure in 2005.

It was added to the National Register of Historic Places in 2007.

References

External links
The Woodford Inn - A Kentucky Bed & Breakfast, official site

National Register of Historic Places in Woodford County, Kentucky
Houses on the National Register of Historic Places in Kentucky
Houses in Woodford County, Kentucky
1926 establishments in Kentucky
Bed and breakfasts in Kentucky
Orphanages in the United States
Houses completed in 1926
Dutch Colonial Revival architecture in the United States
Versailles, Kentucky